Fauk or Fauks may refer to:

 Elisabeth Granneman (1930–1992), Norwegian actress, writer and musician
 Isaac Fawkes (or Fauks; 1675–1732), English conjurer and showman
 Defence Judge Advocate Corps (Denmark)

See also 
 Fawkes
 FAK (disambiguation)